Stilson is an unincorporated community in Hancock County, Iowa, United States.

History
Stilson was platted in 1893. The community's population was 95 in 1902, and 160 in 1925.

References

Unincorporated communities in Hancock County, Iowa
Unincorporated communities in Iowa